Fatemeh Sepehri (born 1964) is a political and women's rights activist and a political prisoner from Iran.

Background
Fatemeh Sepehri was born in 1964. 
Although early challenges prevented her from pursuing her higher education, she passed the entrance exam in 2004 at the age of 40 and received a bachelor’s degree in business management from Ferdowsi University of Mashhad.

The Statement of 14 Political Activists
Sepehri and her brother Mohammad Hossein Sepehri are two of the signatories of the Statement of 14 Political Activists during the 2017–2018 Iranian protests requesting the resignation of Ali Khamenei from his post as the Supreme Leader of the Islamic Republic and later the abolition of Islamic republic and establishment of a democratic secular government.

After signing the letter, Sepehri received a great deal of attention due to the fact that her late husband had lost his life during the Iran–Iraq War. As a result, she came to be known as a martyr's widow. Iranian authorities did not expect the wife of a martyr with strong religious beliefs to urge Khamenei to resign and advocate a secular democratic governing system to replace the Islamic Republic regime.

Shortly after the publication of the two letters, authorities arrested Fatemeh Sepehri, her brother Mohammad Hossein and other signatories to the petitions during a protest in front of the Islamic Azad University of Mashhad. Fatemeh Sepehri was charged with “disorderly conduct, inciting unrest and propagating lies” and sentenced to five years in prison and 154 lashes. She ultimately received a suspended sentence and was released from prison after nine months.

Political activism
Sepehri was detained in Mashhad on Sunday, August 1, 2021 during a peaceful demonstration in support of the protesters in the southwestern province of Khuzestan and to protest the heightened security climate in the country. The demonstrators were also demanding the release of political prisoners.

2022 arrest
During a wave of arrests as a result of Mahsa Amini protests, Sepehri was arrested on September 21 and taken to an unknown location after security agents raided her house.

On October 23, 2022 Sepehari's daughter published a video stating that her mother has been kept in solitary confinement at the Islamic Revolutionary Guard Corps Intelligence center of Mashhad since her arrest, and after enduring more than a month in solitary confinement she can barely speak. The family's appeal to the case investigator and deputy prosecutor of the Mashhad court to transfer her to the general ward has been ineffective.

See also 
‌Mahsa Amini protests
Detainees of the Mahsa Amini protests
Women's rights in Iran
Human rights in Iran

References 

Living people
Iranian prisoners and detainees
People convicted of spreading propaganda against the system by the Islamic Republic of Iran
People convicted of action against national security by the Islamic Republic of Iran
Iranian women activists
Iranian women's rights activists
Iranian dissidents
Iranian human rights activists
1964 births